Andwele Gardner (born February 14, 1978), mononymously known as Dwele, is an American R&B singer, rapper, songwriter and record producer from Detroit, Michigan.

Biography
Gardner was raised on the west side of Detroit in a musical family. He  played piano from the age of six, later taking up trumpet, bass and guitar. He was deeply affected by the fatal shooting of his father outside his home when he was age ten, later stating "I learned to put my emotions into music; it was my therapy." He cites Stevie Wonder, Donny Hathaway, Roy Ayers, Miles Davis, and Freddie Hubbard as favorite artists, and took inspiration from hip hop group A Tribe Called Quest, becoming an MC, and working with Slum Village.

Gardner recorded a demo in his bedroom, called, The Rize, and sold it out of the trunk of his car. He had about 100 copies, which sold out within a week. He caught the ears of local hip hop group Slum Village and their producer J Dilla. Slum Village invited Dwele to sing the hook of the song "Tainted" for their album Trinity (Past, Present and Future). It was successful and led to more high-profile work with rapper Bahamadia, the group Lucy Pearl and London's New Sector Movement. Dwele signed to Virgin Records in 2001, and the label released his debut album, Subject in spring 2003, which mixed neo soul and hip hop.

In a 2005 review in The Independent, his style was summed up: "Dwele's rooted in vintage soul but isn't stuck in the past, overly reverential or an exercise in pastiche - there's a major hip-hop edge which betrays his original incarnation as a rapper." A second album, Some Kinda..., followed in 2005. He then later signed with RT Music Group and KOCH records in March, 2008 He released his fourth album titled, W.ants W.orld W.omen on June 29, 2010.

Dwele was featured on the first single from Kanye West's fifth studio album, My Beautiful Dark Twisted Fantasy. The song is entitled "Power". He is also featured on "Flashing Lights" from West's 2007 album Graduation.

Dwele released the first single, "What Profit", from his fifth studio album Greater Than One. The song was written and produced by Mike City - the same producer behind his other singles "I Think I Love U" and "What's Not to Love". The song was sent to radio on May 22, 2012.

Discography

Albums

Singles

Featured on

References

External links
 – official site

Dwele: W.ants W.orld W.omen review at Cream

Living people
American people of Nigerian descent
American neo soul singers
Midwest hip hop musicians
1978 births
Virgin Records artists
MNRK Music Group artists
American hip hop singers
Singers from Detroit
American contemporary R&B singers
21st-century African-American male singers